Miacora diphyes is a moth in the family Cossidae. It was described by William Trowbridge Merrifield Forbes in 1942. It is found in Panama.

References

Cossinae
Moths described in 1942